is a 1979 Japanese film directed by Chūsei Sone and released by the Nikkatsu studio as part of their Roman porno line. It is the second in the Angel Guts film series, based on a manga by Takashi Ishii.

Synopsis
Writer Muraki becomes obsessed with a porn starlet, Nami, while doing a feature story on her. They begin a short romance after he discovers that Nami was an unwilling participant in a porn film and that its rape sequence was real. When he finds her again, years later, she has descended into prostitution.

Cast
 Yūki Mizuhara as Nami Tsuchiya
 Keizo Kanie as Tetsuro Muraki
 Jun Aki as Keiko Kawashima
 Minako Mizushima as Yuko Kawana

Background
Although this is the second in the Angel Guts series from Nikkatsu, it is the first written by Takashi Ishii and introduces Muraki and Nami as names for the main characters in the series. Ishii's interest was in exploring the relationships between men and women – especially how men view women. Muraki in this film has trouble distinguishing between his idealized image of Nami and her reality.

Critical appraisal
The Weissers call this one of director Chūsei Sone's best films and give it a rating of three and a half stars out of four, while critic Jasper Sharp considers it not only one of Sone's best works, but one of the finest of the entire Roman porno series.

Legacy
American avant-garde band Xiu Xiu named their 2014 album after the film.

Awards
1st Yokohama Film Festival
Won: Best Director - Chūsei Sone
Won: Best Actress - Yūki Mizuhara
Won: Best Supporting Actor - Keizo Kanie
3rd Best Film

References

External links
 
 

1979 films
Live-action films based on manga
Films directed by Chūsei Sone
Erotic romance films
Nikkatsu Roman Porno
Nikkatsu films
1970s erotic films
1970s Japanese films